In computer networking, HTTP 451 Unavailable For Legal Reasons is a proposed standard error status code of the HTTP protocol to be displayed when the user requests a resource which cannot be served for legal reasons, such as a web page censored by a government. The number 451 is a reference to Ray Bradbury's 1953 dystopian novel Fahrenheit 451, in which books are outlawed. 451 provides more information than HTTP 403, which is often used for the same purpose.

Examples of situations where an HTTP 451 error code could be displayed include web pages deemed a danger to national security, or web pages deemed to violate copyright, privacy, blasphemy laws, or any other law or court order.

The RFC is specific that a 451 response does not indicate whether the resource exists but requests for it have been blocked, if the resource has been removed for legal reasons and no longer exists, or even if the resource has never existed, but any discussion of its topic has been legally forbidden (see injunction). Some sites have previously returned HTTP 404 (missing) or similar if they are not legally permitted to disclose that the resource has been removed. It is used in the United Kingdom by some Internet service providers utilising the Internet Watch Foundation blacklist, returning a 404 message or another error message instead of showing a message indicating the site is blocked.

The status code was formally proposed in 2013 by Tim Bray, following earlier informal proposals by Chris Applegate in 2008 and Terence Eden in 2012. It was approved by the IETF on December 18, 2015. It was published as in the Proposed Standard  in February 2016.

HTTP 451 was mentioned by the BBC's From Our Own Correspondent programme, as an indication of the effects of sanctions on Sudan and the inability to access Airbnb, the App Store, or other Western web services.

After introduction of the GDPR in EEA it became common practice for websites located outside EEA to serve HTTP 451 errors to EEA visitors instead of trying to comply with this new privacy law. For instance, many regional U.S. news sites no longer serve web browsers from the EU.

Usage 

When an entity intercepts the request and returns status 451, it should include a "Link" HTTP header field whose value is a URI reference identifying itself. The "Link" header field must then have a "rel" parameter whose value is "blocked-by". This is intended to identify the entity implementing the blocking (an ISP, DNS provider, caching system, etc.), not the legal authority mandating the block. At an IETF hackathon, participants used a web crawler to discover that several implementations misunderstood this header and gave the legal authority instead.

Additional uses 

The meaning of "a resource which cannot be served for legal reasons" has been interpreted to extend beyond government censorship:

 When content cannot be shown in the user's country, due to contractual or licensing restrictions with the content owner, for example, a TV program may not be available to users in some countries.
 When a publisher refuses to serve content to a user, because the user's country adds regulatory requirements that the publisher refuses to comply with, e.g. websites based outside of the EU may refuse to serve users in the EU because they do not want to comply with the GDPR.

Example 

HTTP/1.1 451 Unavailable For Legal Reasons
Link: <https://search.example.net/legal>; rel="blocked-by"
Content-Type: text/html

<html>
 <head><title>Unavailable For Legal Reasons</title></head>
 <body>
  <h1>Unavailable For Legal Reasons</h1>
  <p>This request may not be serviced in the Roman Province
  of Judea due to the Lex Julia Majestatis, which disallows
  access to resources hosted on servers deemed to be
  operated by the People's Front of Judea.</p>
 </body>
</html>

See also 
 Evil bit
 Gag order
 Superinjunction
 Technological fix

References

External links
RFC 7725 – An HTTP Status Code to Report Legal Obstacles

HTTP_451 legal
Internet censorship